Pori sub-region  is a subdivision of Satakunta and one of the Sub-regions of Finland since 2009.

Municipalities 

 Harjavalta
 Huittinen
 Kokemäki
 Merikarvia
 Nakkila
 Pomarkku
 Pori
 Ulvila

Politics 
Results of the 2018 Finnish presidential election:

 Sauli Niinistö   64.1%
 Laura Huhtasaari   11.0%
 Pekka Haavisto   7.8%
 Paavo Väyrynen   5.7%
 Tuula Haatainen   4.1%
 Merja Kyllönen   3.9%
 Matti Vanhanen   3.0%
 Nils Torvalds   0.4%

References 

Sub-regions of Finland
Geography of Satakunta